Chris Rob, born Christopher Robinson, is an American musician, originally from Chicago, Illinois, who currently resides in Brooklyn, New York. Rob, the younger brother of actor, comedian, and musician Craig Robinson, attended Roosevelt University in Chicago and earned a degree in music.

Early life
Rob was born and raised in the South Side of Chicago. Through the early influence of his mother, a classical concert pianist and musical educator, Rob developed into a multi-instrumentalist playing the piano, electric piano, organ, drums, guitar, and bass guitar. Rob credits his mother, older brother Craig Robinson, and artists such as, Herbie Hancock, Nina Simone, Daryl Coley, Steely Dan, and DJ Premier as significant influences of his musical framework.

Career

Rob performed as the opening act at a pre-Grammy brunch sponsored by attorney Londell McMillan and the Artist Empowerment Coalition; and was also featured on both the ASCAP and BMI showcases in lower Manhattan.{{unreliable source?]}} While on tour as the keyboardist and backup vocalist, he also took on the position of musical director for John Legend's 'Get Lifted' Tour.

Chris Rob also performed with Stevie Wonder in Washington D.C. for President Barack Obama's inauguration festivities. In addition to his own solo shows, Rob directs the stage for classic hip hop artists including Pete Rock & CL Smooth, Black Moon, Talib Kweli, and The Real Live Show. He collaborates heavily with producers like DJ Spinna and Devo Springsteen. Rob toured with Atlantic Records' artist Laura Izibor as well as his own older brother, actor/comedian Craig Robinson (NBC's "The Office").

He has also opened for or played with Prince & the New Power Generation, Elton John, Snoop Dogg, John Mayer, Ashford & Simpson, Jill Scott, The Roots, The Black Eyed Peas, Alicia Keys, Barry Manilow, Roberta Flack, Common, Meshell Ndegeocello, Cee-Lo Green, Anthony Hamilton, and Patti Austin.

His television appearances include The Grammy Awards, "Oprah", "The Tonight Show with Jay Leno", "The Office", "Late Night with Conan O'Brien", "The Ellen DeGeneres Show", "Jimmy Kimmel Live!", The Soul Train Awards, "Entertainment Tonight", "Raymond is Laat" (Amsterdam), "Top of the Pops" (Amsterdam, London), and Jules Holland (London). Rob has released four studio albums and his latest single No Doubt was released in June 2018.

Discography

References

External links
Chris Rob - Official Site
My Space - Chris Rob's My Space Page
Facebook - Chris Rob's Facebook Fan Page
YouTube - Chris Rob's YouTube Channel

American male rappers
American multi-instrumentalists
Living people
Rappers from Chicago
Rappers from New York City
Record producers from New York (state)
Record producers from Illinois
Songwriters from New York (state)
Songwriters from Illinois
Year of birth missing (living people)
American male songwriters
The Nasty Delicious members